Lyckholm Airfield (ICAO: EELU) is an airfield in Saare, Lääne County, Estonia.

The airfield's owner is Herbert Trisberg.

References

Airports in Estonia
Buildings and structures in Lääne County
Lääne-Nigula Parish